Orenburg Oblast (Orenburgskaya oblast) is a federal subject of Russia (an oblast). Its administrative center is the city of Orenburg. From 1938 to 1957, it bore the name Chkalov Oblast in honor of Valery Chkalov. Population: 2,033,072 (2010 Census).

Geography
Orenburg Oblast's internal borders are with the republics of Bashkortostan and Tatarstan to the north, Chelyabinsk Oblast to the north-east, and with Samara and Saratov oblasts to the west. Orenburg Oblast also shares an international border with Kazakhstan to the east and south. The oblast is situated on the boundary between Europe and Asia. The majority of its territory lies west of the continental divide in European Russia and smaller sections in the east situated on the Asian side of the divide. The most important river of the oblast is the Ural and the largest lake Shalkar-Yega-Kara. Orenburg is traversed by the northeasterly line of equal latitude and longitude.

Administrative divisions

Demographics

Population:

Settlements

According to the 2010 Census, the ethnic composition of the oblast was as follows:
Russians: 75.9%
Tatars: 7.6%
Kazakhs: 6%
Ukrainians: 2.5%
Bashkirs: 2.3%
Mordvins: 1.9%
Germans: 0.6%
Chuvash: 0.6%
Belarusians: 0.3%
Azeris: 0.4%
other groups, none more than 0.2% of the population
30,449 people were registered from administrative databases, and could not declare an ethnicity. It is estimated that the proportion of ethnicities in this group is the same as that of the declared group.

Vital statistics for 2012
Births: 29 736 (14.7 per 1000)
Deaths: 28 225 (13.9 per 1000)
Total fertility rate: 2009 - 1.76 | 2010 - 1.80 | 2011 - 1.80 | 2012 - 1.95  | 2013 - 2.00 | 2014 - 2.03 | 2015 - 2.01 | 2016 - 1.95(e)

Religion

As of a 2012 survey, 40.2% of the population of Orenburg Oblast adheres to the Russian Orthodox Church, 3% declare themselves to be generic nondenominational Christians (excluding the Protestant definition), 2% are Orthodox Christian believers who do not belong to any church or belong to non-Russian Orthodox churches. Muslims constitute 13% of the population. 3% of the population are followers of the Slavic native faith (Rodnovery), 6.8% are followers of other religions or did not give an answer to the survey. In addition, 20% of the population declares to be "spiritual but not religious" and 12% to be atheist.

Economy
Orenburg Oblast is one of the major agricultural areas of Russia. Its climate is favorable to farming with a humid spring, dry summer and many sunny days, which make perfect conditions for cultivating hard wheat and rye, sunflowers, potatoes, peas, beans, corn, and gourds.

The range of the oblast's export commodities includes oil and oil products, gas and gas produced products, rolled ferrous and non-ferrous metals, nickel, asbestos, chromium compounds, rough copper, electric engines, and radiators, which are used to make products from the machine-building industry.

See also

Ashchebutak (air base)
List of Chairmen of the Legislative Assembly of Orenburg Oblast
Black Dolphin Prison

References

External links 

 

 
States and territories established in 1934